Richard Wainwright may refer to:

Military
 Richard Wainwright (American Civil War naval officer) (1817–1862), Commander in the Union Navy during the American Civil War
 Richard Wainwright (Spanish–American War naval officer) (1849–1926), Admiral in the U.S. Navy during the Spanish–American War
 Richard Wainwright (World War I naval officer) (1881–1944), Commander in the U.S. Navy, awarded Medal of Honor

Others
 Richard Wainwright (composer) (1757–1825), English church organist and composer
 Richard Wainwright (politician) (1918–2003), British politician and businessman